Paska's blue-eye (Pseudomugil paskai) is a species of fish in the subfamily Pseudomugilinae. It is found in the Fly River system in Papua New Guinea.

Etymology
The specific name honours John Paska who was a technician with the Papua New Guinea Ministry of Fisheries.

References

Pseudomugil
Taxa named by Gerald R. Allen 
Taxa named by Walter Ivantsoff
Fish described in 1986
Taxonomy articles created by Polbot